The giant Visayan frog (Limnonectes visayanus) is a species of frog in the family Dicroglossidae.
It is endemic to the Philippines, and is known from Masbate, Cebu, Negros, Guimaras, Panay, and Siquijor islands.

Its natural habitats are subtropical or tropical moist lowland forest, subtropical or tropical swampland, subtropical or tropical moist montane forest, subtropical or tropical moist shrubland, subtropical or tropical seasonally wet or flooded lowland grassland, rivers, intermittent rivers, freshwater marshes, intermittent freshwater marshes, arable land, pastureland, plantations, rural gardens, urban areas, heavily degraded former forest, ponds, irrigated land, and seasonally flooded agricultural land. 

Giant Visayan frog is threatened by habitat loss. It is classified as vulnerable and considered to be facing a high risk of extinction in the wild.

References

Limnonectes
Amphibians of the Philippines
Endemic fauna of the Philippines
Fauna of the Visayas
Taxonomy articles created by Polbot
Amphibians described in 1954